As Tears Go By is a 1988 Hong Kong action crime drama film starring Andy Lau, Maggie Cheung and Jacky Cheung. The film was the directorial debut of Wong Kar-wai, and was inspired by Martin Scorsese's Mean Streets. The central plot revolves around a small-time triad member trying to keep his friend out of trouble. The film was screened at the 1989 Cannes Film Festival, during International Critics' Week.

Plot
Wah is a mob enforcer who primarily deals with debt collection. His subordinate, Fly, is less successful and not as well respected as Wah. Fly frequently causes trouble and borrows money he can't pay back. Out of the blue, Wah receives a call from his aunt, informing him that his younger cousin Ngor, whom he has never met, will be coming to stay with him in Hong Kong for the next few days. Ngor, who works at her family's restaurant on Lantau Island, must come to Hong Kong for a medical procedure.

Soon after Ngor arrives at his apartment, Wah has to leave to help Fly collect a debt. After the job, Wah goes to see his girlfriend, Mabel, who dumps him. Because he had been so distant and unresponsive, she had aborted his baby. Wah had not even been aware she was pregnant in the first place and reacts badly. Wah stumbles home angry and drunk, but when Ngor tries to console him later that night, he becomes very aggressive and threatens to throw her out. The next morning, Wah apologizes to Ngor and offers to take her out to a movie to make up for his behavior.

In order to make money to pay off a loan to a fellow gang member, Tony, Fly makes an unreasonably high bet in a game of snooker. When he realizes there is no chance he can win or pay his debt, he makes a run for it with his friend Site. After being chased through the streets, Fly and Site are caught and severely beaten by members of Tony's gang. As Wah and Ngor are about to leave the apartment, Fly arrives, bruised and bloody and carrying an unconscious Site. Wah and Ngor treat their wounds, and Ngor starts to questions Wah's line of work. The next day, she returns to Lantau, leaving Wah a note asking him to come to visit her sometime.

Wah meets with Tony to settle Fly's debt. Tony says to Wah that if Fly wasn't his friend he would already be dead. Unable to pay the interest on the debt, Wah steals the money from the owner of the establishment Tony was hired to protect. Insulted by Wah's behavior, Tony takes his grievance to Uncle Kwan, the mob boss, who forces Tony and Wah to accept a monthly payment compromise. Afterward, Kwan tells Wah to get Fly under control before he gets himself killed. Accepting that Fly is not cut out for mob work, Wah gets him a legitimate job selling fishballs from a food cart.

After accidentally meeting Mabel and finding out she is now married, Wah decides to visit Ngor. Arriving at her family's restaurant in Lantau, he learns that she is in Kowloon for the day and will return that evening. Wah meets Ngor at the ferry terminal and learns that she has begun seeing her doctor. Over the next couple of days, Wah helps out at the restaurant and his relationship with Ngor evolves. Meanwhile, Tony visits Fly to insult him and his new job. Fly wrecks Tony's car in retaliation, but Tony's gang promptly catches him and beats him near to death. Wah has to cut his visit with Ngor short, after receiving a call from Tony demanding money in exchange for Fly's life.

Arriving at Tony's place, Wah surprises Tony by threatening him. Tony gives in to Wah's demands and lets Fly go. Wah urges Fly to return to his family in the countryside, which Fly refuses to do. Leaving the bar, they are attacked by Tony and his gang and severely beaten. Fly leaves Wah, telling Wah to forget him because he has been a terrible friend. Wah manages to return to Lantau where Ngor and her doctor treat his wounds. He recovers, and the two rekindle their relationship.

Back in Hong Kong, Uncle Kwan gives Tony a job to assassinate an informant. Tony is afraid to do the job since it is essentially a suicide mission. Fly offers to take the job in order to humiliate Tony, whose thugs abandon him in disgust. Hearing Fly has taken this job, Wah returns to confront him, and attempts in vain to persuade Fly not to do it. Wah arrives at the police station just as Fly is about to carry out the assassination. Fly shoots the informant but fails to kill him. Instead, he is shot and killed by the police. Wah grabs Fly's gun and kills the informant, finishing the job. As Wah is gunned down, he thinks of his first kiss with Ngor.

Cast
 Andy Lau as Wah
 Maggie Cheung as Ngor
 Jacky Cheung as Fly (烏蠅 Wu Ying)
 William Chang as Ngor's doctor
 Lam Kau as Kung
 Alex Man as Tony
 Ronald Wong as Site

Release

Home Media
The film debuted on the Blu-ray format in the United States on January 20, 2009. The disc, released by MegaStar, has since gone out of print.

The film was released on Blu-ray by the Criterion Collection on March 23, 2021 in a collection of 7 Wong Kar-wai films.

Box office
During its initial Hong Kong theatrical run, As Tears Go By grossed HK$11,532,283. Until the release of The Grandmaster in January 2013, it was Wong Kar-wai's highest-grossing film in Hong Kong.

Awards and nominations

See also
 Andy Lau filmography
 Jacky Cheung filmography
 List of Hong Kong films

References

External links
 
 
 
 
 

Hong Kong New Wave films
1988 films
1980s action drama films
1988 crime drama films
1988 romantic drama films
Hong Kong action drama films
Hong Kong crime drama films
Hong Kong romantic drama films
Triad films
Films directed by Wong Kar-wai
1980s Cantonese-language films
Films set in Hong Kong
Films shot in Hong Kong
1988 directorial debut films
1980s Hong Kong films